The uneven bars or asymmetric bars is an artistic gymnastics apparatus. It is made of a steel frame. The bars are made of fiberglass with wood coating, or less commonly wood.  The English abbreviation for the event in gymnastics scoring is UB or AB, and the apparatus and event are often referred to simply as "bars". The bars are placed at different heights and widths, allowing the gymnast to transition from bar to bar. A gymnast usually adds white chalk to the hands so that they can grip the bar better.

The apparatus 
Uneven bars used in international  gymnastics competitions must conform to the guidelines and specifications set forth by the International Gymnastics Federation Apparatus Norms brochure. Several companies manufacture and sell bars, including AAI in the United States, Jannsen and Fritsen in Europe, and Acromat in Australia.

Many gyms also have a single bar or a set of uneven bars over a loose foam pit or soft mat for learning new skills to provide an additional level of safety.

Dimensions 
Measurements depend on the setting of the bar. Measurements of the bars are provided by the Fédération Internationale de Gymnastique (FIG) in the Apparatus Norms brochure.

 Height:
 High bar: 
 Low bar: 
 Diameter of bar: 
 Length of the bars: 
 Diagonal distance between the two bars: varies, – (adjustable)

Routines 
Routines usually include a lot of strength, jumping and swings. Routines are generally composed from a set of skills each worth a particular value.

Evolution 
The uneven bars apparatus originally consisted of men's parallel bars set to different heights. Consequently, the bars were very close together, and gymnasts could transition from one to the other with little difficulty. Routines of the early 1950s chiefly consisted of simple circles, kips, and static balance elements and holds. In the late 1950s the trend shifted toward fluid motion, and gymnasts began to perform routines composed of more difficult circles, kips, beats (bouncing the body off the low bar while hanging from the high bar), wraps (wrapping the body around the low bar while hanging from the high bar) and transitions. Release moves also began to come into play, although they were almost entirely limited to transitions between the low and high bars.
In the late 1960s/early 1970s, companies began manufacturing uneven bars as a separate specific apparatus. The design was changed slightly to allow the bars to be adjustable, with tension cables that held the apparatus to the floor. As a result of this change, coaches could set the bars farther apart. Additionally, the circumference of the bars themselves decreased, allowing gymnasts to grasp and swing from them with greater ease.

As other events in gymnastics increased in difficulty, so did the uneven bars. Gymnasts and coaches began experimenting with elements, attempting more challenging dismounts, and adapting moves from men's horizontal bar. In 1972, Olga Korbut pioneered the Korbut Flip, the first high bar salto release move. Nadia Comăneci continued the trend with her original Comaneci salto at the 1976 Olympic Games in Montreal and advanced handstand elements four years later. The giant swing, the staple of high bar in men's artistic gymnastics (MAG), was also adopted into the women's Code of Points, and quickly became a basic uneven bars skill.

By the mid 1980s, routines had become so based on swing and release moves that the bars were moved even farther apart. The distance between bars increased even more as gymnasts developed difficult transition elements that required space, such as the Pak salto.

For international elite level gymnasts, there is a required distance between the low and high bar, called FIG setting, where all elite level gymnasts must compete.

Of all the apparatus in women's artistic gymnastics (WAG), uneven bars is probably the one that has seen the most radical changes. Most elements from 1950s and 60s bars routines, such as the Hecht dismount and the Radochla somersault, are now completely obsolete and almost never used; others, such as the once-traditional beats and wraps, are impossible given the current diagonal separation between bars; and still others, such as static holds and the Korbut Flip, are not permitted under the current Code of Points.
In USAG levels 1–5, everyone in the same level performs the same compulsory routine. In levels 1-3 the gymnasts stay only on the low bar.  Once the gymnast reaches level 4, she uses both the low and high bar. In levels 6 through Elite, gymnasts and coaches make up their own routines within specific requirements using both of the bars.

In Gymnastics Australia gymnasts in levels 1-6 set routines that are scored out of 10. In levels 7-10, and elite, gymnasts perform optional routines that adhere to set guidelines that meet certain requirements.

International level routines 
A routine on the uneven bars must consist of:
Flight element from high bar to low bar and vice versa
Flight element on the same bar
At least two different grips, and a close bar circle element
Non flight with a turn on the bar, for example turning handstands
Dismount

Scoring and rules 
Judges score routines based on difficulty, form, technique, and composition. Deductions are taken for execution errors, poor form, falls, pauses, "empty" swings (extra swings that do not lead into another skill), steps on the dismount, and other mistakes. Falls incur an automatic deduction of 1 full point in the 2009 FIG CoP. For levels 1-10 a fall is 0.5 points. Also, if the gymnast hits the low bar with her foot/feet (as Beth Tweddle did at the 2008 Olympics bars qualifications, and Viktoria Komova did at the 2012 Olympics bars apparatus finals), a deduction of 0.1 to 0.5 points will occur depending on the severity of the hit. The same deduction occurs when the gymnast hits one or both feet on the floor while performing a skill on the low bar.

Apparatus specific rules 

Gymnasts are permitted to tape their hands or use grips or hand guards on bars level 4 through elite. Their coaches are also permitted to apply chalk and/or water to the bars to ensure gymnasts don't slip off.

Unlike high bar and rings in MAG, gymnasts may not be lifted to the uneven bars to begin their routines. They may mount the apparatus with either a simple or a difficult skill, on either the high or low bar; running mounts and springboards are permitted.

Once the routine has started, the coach may not physically interfere with the athlete in any way. The coach is permitted to stand on the mat during release moves and dismounts. If the gymnast falls on one of these skills, her coach is allowed to catch her or break her fall; the coach is also allowed to lift her back to the high bar to continue her routine. If a springboard has been used for the mount, the coach is supposed to quickly step in and remove it so that it does not interfere with the routine.

If a gymnast falls from the apparatus, she has 30 seconds to re-mount. Within this time limit, she is allowed to readjust her grips or chalk her hands again, if necessary. However, if she does not return to the bars within 30 seconds, her routine will be finished. Many judges are flexible with this rule, especially if the gymnast took a hard fall and needs a minute to shake it off and re-gain her focus. Often the judge or judging assistant will give the gymnast a ten-second warning.

Olympic champions at the uneven bars

References

External links and sources

The 2009-2012 Code of Points
Apparatus description at the FIG website
US Gym Net's glossary of uneven bars skills
Animations and explanations of basic bars skills
The Complete Book of Gymnastics, David Hunn, Ward Lock Ltd, London, 1980, 
Description of gymnastics technique by animation

Artistic gymnastics apparatus